The University of Silicon Valley Law School (USVLS) (also named The University of Silicon Valley School of Law on its logo) is registered with the California Committee of Bar Examiners as a private law school with offices located in Fremont, California. The school's website says it offers a part-time, four-year law program in which all classes are taken in the evenings in Fremont, California.

Registration
It has used the name Silicon Valley University Law School in its registration with the California Committee of Bar Examiners of the State Bar of California as an unaccredited law school. It is not approved by the American Bar Association. As such, students from USVLS must take and pass the First-Year Law Students' Examination, also known as the "Baby Bar", at the end of their first year in order to receive credit for their first year law study and eventually qualify to sit for the California Bar Examination.

Notes

References

External links
 

Silicon Valley
Private universities and colleges in California
Educational institutions established in 2003
2003 establishments in California
Education in Fremont, California